Roberto Helbert Sánchez Palomino (Huaral, February 3, 1969) is a Peruvian psychologist and politician. He is a congressman of the Congress of the Republic of Peru for the period 2021-2026 and was 

Minister of Foreign Trade and Tourism for Pedro Castillo from July 29, 2021 until his resignation on December 7, 2022.

Biography 
Roberto was born in Huaral on February 3, 1969.  He studied Psychology at the National University of San Marcos.

In 2020, he was appointed manager of Social Development of the Provincial Municipality of Huaral.

Political career 
In the 2006 general elections, Roberto ran for congress for the Decentralist Concertation for Lima, without success, he obtained 1,259 votes.

In the 2006 regional and municipal elections, Roberto was a candidate for mayor of Huaral for the Peruvian Humanist Party, but was unsuccessful in winning it.

He was part of the Peruvian Humanist Party, later he joined Together for Peru, where he is the president as of 2022.

Congressman 
In the 2021 general elections, he was elected congressman for the Republic of Peru with Together for Peru, with 29,827 votes, for the 2021-2026 parliamentary period.

On July 29, 2021, he was appointed Minister of Foreign Trade and Tourism in the government of Pedro Castillo.

References 

Peruvian politicians
1969 births
Living people